The UK Singles Chart is one of many music charts compiled by the Official Charts Company that calculates the best-selling singles of the week in the United Kingdom. Before 2004, the chart was only based on the sales of physical singles. New Musical Express (NME) magazine had published the United Kingdom record charts for the first time in 1952. NME originally published only a top 12 (although the first chart had a couple of singles that were tied so a top 15 was announced) but this was gradually extended to encompass a top 20 by October 1954. This list shows singles that peaked in the Top 10 of the UK Singles Chart during 1955, as well as singles which peaked in 1954 and 1956 but were in the top 10 in 1955. The entry date is when the single appeared in the top 10 for the first time (week ending, as published by the Official Charts Company, which is six days after the chart is announced).

Eighty singles were in the top ten in 1955. Eleven singles from 1954 remained in the top 10 for several weeks at the beginning of the year, while "Meet Me on the Corner" by Max Bygraves, "Suddenly There's a Valley" by Petula Clark and "Twenty Tiny Fingers" by The Stargazers were all released in 1955 but did not reach their peak until 1956. "No One But You" by Billy Eckstine, "The Finger of Suspicion (Points at You)" by Dickie Valentine with The Stargazers and "Heartbeat" by Ruby Murray were the songs from 1954 to reach their peak in 1955. Nineteen artists scored multiple entries in the top 10 in 1955. Bill Haley & His Comets, Malcolm Vaughan, Slim Whitman, Teresa Brewer and Tony Martin were among the many artists who achieved their first UK charting top 10 single in 1955.

The 1954 Christmas number-one, "Let's Have Another Party" by Winifred Atwell, remained at number-one for the first week of 1955. The first new number-one single of the year was "The Finger of Suspicion" by Dickie Valentine with The Stargazers. Overall, fifteen different singles peaked at number-one in 1955, with Dickie Valentine and Jimmy Young (2) having the joint most singles hit that position.

Background

Multiple entries
Eighty singles charted in the top 10 in 1955, with seventy-two singles reaching their peak this year. Nine songs were recorded by several artists with each version reaching the top 10:

"A Blossom Fell" - Dickie Valentine, Nat King Cole, Ronnie Hilton
"Cherry Pink (and Apple Blossom White)" - Eddie Calvert, Pérez 'Prez' Prado and His Orchestra
"Hey There" - Johnnie Ray, Rosemary Clooney
"Let Me Go, Lover!" - Dean Martin, Ruby Murray, Teresa Brewer with The Lancers
"Mr. Sandman" - Dickie Valentine, The Four Aces
"Stranger in Paradise" - The Four Aces, Tony Bennett, Tony Martin
"The Naughty Lady of Shady Lane" - The Ames Brothers, Dean Martin
"Unchained Melody" - Al Hibbler, Jimmy Young, Les Baxter
"Under the Bridges of Paris" - Dean Martin, Eartha Kitt

Nineteen artists scored multiple entries in the top 10 in 1955. Ruby Murray secured the record for most top 10 hits in 1955 with seven hit singles.

The Stargazers were one of a number of artists with three top-ten entries, including the number-one single "The Finger of Suspicion (Points at You)". Dean Martin, The Four Aces, Johnnie Ray and The Mellomen were among the other artists who had multiple top 10 entries in 1955.

Chart debuts
Twenty-six artists achieved their first top 10 single in 1955, either as a lead or featured artist. Bill Haley & His Comets and Slim Whitman both had two other entries in their breakthrough year.

The following table (collapsed on desktop site) does not include acts who had previously charted as part of a group and secured their first top 10 solo single.

Songs from films
Original songs from various films entered the top 10 throughout the year. These included "Cherry Pink (and Apple Blossom White)" (from Underwater!), "Ready, Willing and Able" (Young at Heart), "Rose Marie" & "Indian Love Call" (Rose Marie), "John and Julie" (John and Juliet), "The Man from Laramie" (The Man from Laramie), "The Yellow Rose of Texas" (Giant) and "Rock Around the Clock" (Blackboard Jungle).

Additionally, "Stranger in Paradise" (from the film Kismet) was covered by several artists who took it into the top 10 (The Four Aces, Tony Bennett and Tony Martin) and "Unchained Melody - nominated for Best Original Song at the Academy Awards for the original version by Todd Duncan - was recorded by Al Hibbler, Jimmy Young and Les Baxter, His Chorus & Orchestra, while "Love Is a Many-Splendored Thing" from the film of the same name entered the charts in a version by The Four Aces featuring Al Alberts. "Hernando's Hideaway" from The Pajama Game reached the top 10 after being released by The Johnston Brothers, and Fats Domino's version of "Ain't That a Shame" - covered by Pat Boone - was used in "Shake, Rattle & Rock!".

Best-selling singles
Until 1970 there was no universally recognised year-end best-sellers list. However in 2011 the Official Charts Company released a list of the best-selling single of each year in chart history from 1952 to date. According to the list, "Rose Marie" by Slim Whitman is officially recorded as the biggest-selling single of 1955. "Rock Around the Clock" by Bill Haley & His Comets (1) was ranked as the best-selling single of the decade.

Top-ten singles
Key

Entries by artist

The following table shows artists who achieved two or more top 10 entries in 1955, including singles that reached their peak in 1954 or 1956. The figures include both main artists and featured artists. The total number of weeks an artist spent in the top ten in 1955 is also shown.

Notes

 "Hold My Hand" re-entered the top 10 at number 7 on 13 January 1955 (week ending).
 "This Ole House" re-entered the top 10 at number 5 on 4 November 1954 (week ending) for 10 weeks and at number 10 on 20 January 1955 (week ending) for 2 weeks. 
 "Rain Rain Rain" re-entered the top 10 at number 9 on 16 December 1954 (week ending) for 4 weeks and at number 8 on 27 January 1955 (week ending).
 "Give Me Your Word" is recorded as the best-selling single of the year by some sources but the Official Charts Company lists "Rose Marie" as its best-seller.
 "The Naughty Lady of Shady Lane" (Dean Martin version) re-entered the top 10 at number 7 on 24 March 1955 (week ending).
 "Let Me Go Lover" (Teresa Brewer with The Lancers version) re-entered the top 10 at number 10 on 24 March 1955 (week ending).
 "Ready, Willing and Able" re-entered the top 10 at number 9 on 21 April 1955 (week ending) for 2 weeks.
 "If You Believe" re-entered the top 10 at number 8 on 9 June 1955 (week ending) for 3 weeks.
 "Unchained Melody" (Les Baxter version) re-entered the top 10 at number 10 on 30 June 1955 (week ending).
 "Indian Love Call" re-entered the top 10 at number 10 on 13 October 1955 (week ending).
 "Rock Around the Clock" re-entered the top 10 at number 8 on 18 October 1956 (week ending) for 5 weeks.
 "Suddenly There's a Valley" re-entered the top 10 at number 9 on 29 December 1955 (week ending) for 4 weeks.
 Figures includes single that first charted in 1954 but peaked in 1955.
 Figure includes single that peaked in 1954.
 Figure includes single that peaked in 1956.

See also
1955 in British music
List of number-one singles from the 1950s (UK)

References
General

Specific

External links
1955 singles chart archive at the Official Charts Company (click on relevant week)

1955 record charts
1955
1955 in British music